The Color Changin' Click was an American hip hop group formed in 2001 by Chamillionaire and Paul Wall. The group disbanded in 2005.
Chamillionaire and Paul were part of a group prior to Color Changing Click called The Sleepwalkers. It's unclear if there were 3 or 4 members of the group, but PKT (short for Pimp Killa Thug) was definitely part of the group. Not much more is known about the group other than they used to open up for Swishahouse members prior to being in Swishahouse themselves.

Biography

Chamillionaire and Paul Wall
Friends since childhood, Paul and Chamillionaire broke into the music industry by doing promotions for various southern hip-hop entities such as Cash Money Records. Eventually, they got jobs doing promotions for Swishahouse. While there, they recorded a demo for Swishahouse that gained a lot of attention, and soon people wanted to know who made it. Paul and Chamillionaire kept asking Swishahouse CEO Michael 5000 Watts to let them get a couple of verses on some mixtapes. However, they were constantly put to the side for other artists, and when they did get a chance to perform, they weren't getting paid well. Eventually, Paul and Chamillionaire decided to break out on their own and left Swishahouse.

The pair signed with Paid in Full Entertainment, a record label owned by the Madd Hatta, and released Get Ya Mind Correct in 2002. It was an instant hit in Houston, selling over 150,000 copies independently and getting nominated by the Source as one of the finalists for the indie album of the year in 2002.

However, disputes over artistic direction led to friction between the two. They were set to release their second album, Controversy Sells, but the lingering issues led the group to split before the album saw the light of day. Controversy Sells did eventually get released in 2005. Paul decided to return to Swishahouse, while Chamillionaire started his own label, Chamillitary Entertainment. His younger brother Rasaq, Yung Ro, 50/50 Lil' Twin, and OG Ron C were signed to the label.

Their relationship was further strained by Paul's friendship with Mike Jones. Chamillionaire claims that Jones was saying foul things behind his back while being cool with him in person. After a short lived feud with Jones, and a "disagreement" with Paul Wall, Chamillionaire has since made peace with both artists. Paul Wall and Chamillionaire have performed together since, and collabed soon after on Paul Wall's song, Diamonds Exposed, with Lil Keke "the Don" or also known as "Don Ke".

Members

Chamillionaire

Chamillionaire (born Hakeem Seriki; November 28, 1979) is a two time Grammy Award nominated and one-time Grammy Award winning rapper from the Acres Homes section of Houston. Founder and lead rapper/singer of the Color Changin Click, he has publicly stated that his aim is to prove that the South can produce quality lyricists. He is also a hook writer and usually sings and harmonizes with himself (using double-tracked vocals) on his own hooks. He started his own label Chamillitary Entertainment.

Rasaq
Rasaq (born Rasaq Temidayo Seriki; January 7, 1981) is a rapper from Houston, Texas, who is also the younger brother of rapper Chamillionaire and was a backup member of the CCC. He maintains that he is also from the block. He was featured on his brother's debut album The Sound of Revenge with Lil Wayne on the song "Fly As The Sky" in 2005, and the album Ghetto Status alongside his brother. Recently, started his own independent label named, Royal Green. In 2011 he released his comeback mixtape entitled Vanity with production done almost entirely by himself. In 2013 he released another mixtape called Premonition.

50/50 Lil' Twin
50/50 Lil' Twin (born Roderick Brown; July 18, 1980) is a Texas rapper and the co-founder of the CCC, he was part of "Paid In Full Records." Appeared on songs with artists such as Paul Wall and Slim Thug. Currently is creating his own label Roc 4 Roc Records. According to his Twitter account @5050TWIN he is currently working on an album entitled King Tut 50. Like Chamillionaire, Twin was also a member of Swishahouse.

Yung Ro
Yung Ro (born Russell Scott Bradshaw; April 16, 1982) is a Texas rapper who was once signed to Paid In Full Records. Appeared on mixtapes such as "Homer Pimpson" and has had solo releases of his own. In 2008, he was signed to Chamillitary Entertainment, but due to a disagreement with Chamillionaire he is no longer on the label, because of feuds with the law.

Paul Wall

Paul Wall (born Paul Michael Slayton; March 11, 1981) is an American rapper and hip hop artist, DJ, promoter and jeweler from Houston, Texas. Paul Wall is affiliated with Swishahouse Records. Paul Wall was one of the original Swishahouse members, left to Paid In Full, then returned to the Swishahouse. He was the original member of the Color Changin' Click from 1999-2002.

Lew Hawk
Lew Hawk (born Lewis Kinoshi; June 2, 1978). He was the original member of The Color Changin' Click with Paul Wall from 1996-2000, He most recently was working with Paul Wall on his albums like Get Money, Stay True and other projects.

Discography

Albums
2002 - Get Ya Mind Correct (Color Changin' Click cover)
2005 - Controversy Sells

Mixtapes
2000 - Homestead To Da 44
2001 - Ace Ventura
2001 - Bobby Booshay
2001 - Homer Pimpson
2002 - Bobby Booshay 2
2002 - K-mart Blue Light Special
2003 - Superbowl XXXVIII
2003 - The Army
2003 - Cleveland Bootleggaz Special
2003 - Deuce Bigalow
2003 - Ghetto Status
2003 - Mu-Shu Academy
2004 - Bootleggaz Special 1.5
2004 - The Waterboy
2006 - Homer Pimpson 2

External links
Chamillitary
Grills By Paul Wall

American hip hop groups
Rappers from Houston
Musical groups from Houston
Underground hip hop groups